Englishville may refer to:

 Englishville, Ohio
 Englishville, Michigan